Athena Loizides  (Greek Αθηνά Λοιζίδου, born 26 March 1965) is a Greek Cypriot television presenter, cookbook author and food writer, specialising in Cypriot and Greek cuisine.

Career
She wrote her first cook book Recipes from all Over in 2007. She then started writing the food pages for the magazine Livingetc, Cyprus edition. In 2009 she published her second cookbook, Stis Athena's in Greek. Her other works include:

2010 Cyprus Cuisine in English
2011 To Oikogeniako Trapezi  in Greek
2013 Ta Mystika tis Koyzinas moy in Greek 
2015 Efkola & Kypriaka  in Greek
2017 ITS ALL GREEK TO ME  in English, a book on Greek and Cypriot cuisine. 

She has her own monthly magazine EFKOLA & SPITIKA distributed by the Kathimerini newspaper in Cyprus.

References

External links

Cypriot women television presenters
Greek Cypriot writers
People from Nicosia
1965 births
Living people